John R. Settle (born June 2, 1965), is an American football coach and former player. He played professionally as a running back in the National Football League (NFL). A 5'9", 207-lb. undrafted running back from Appalachian State University, Settle attended Rockingham County High School where he still holds both the single game, single season, and career rushing records. He played for the Atlanta Falcons from 1987 to 1990 and the Washington Redskins his next 2 seasons where he won a super bowl. During the 1988 NFL season, he was selected the Pro Bowl after rushing for a career-high 1,024 yards and 7 touchdowns. He was the first undrafted running back in NFL history to rush for over 1,000 yards in a season. Settle was the running backs coach for the University of Kentucky. Settle was a founding member of the Pi Nu chapter of Alpha Phi Alpha fraternity.

College Statistics
 1983: 135 carries for 613 yards with 4 TD
 1984: 185 carries for 795 yards with 5 TD
 1985: 254 carries for 1,340 yards with 14 TD
 1986: 317 carries for 1,661 yards with 20 TD

NFL Playing Career
Settle signed with the Atlanta Falcons as an undrafted free agent and played six seasons in the NFL. In his first four with Atlanta 1987-1990 he was named to a Pro Bowl selection in 1988, when he accumulated 1,594 yards of offense (1,024 rushing and 570 receiving) and became the first undrafted free agent in NFL history to rush for 1,000 yards in a season. His final two seasons he spent in Washington where he played for Washington’s Super Bowl-winning team in 1991.

Coaching career
John began his coaching career at his alma mater in 1994 serving as the team’s running backs coach. Settle had a three-year stint coaching in the NFL as an offensive assistant from 1995-1997 with the Cleveland Browns and the Baltimore Ravens (when they moved) under head coaches Bill Belichick and Ted Marchibroda.
Settle then coached running backs at Fresno State from 1998–2005, where he tutored six 1,000-yard rushers. Some of the players he coached included: Jaime Kimbrough, Paris Gaines, Derrick Ward, Rodney Davis, Dwayne Wright, Bryson Sumlin, and Wendell Mathis. In 2006 he took the job as running backs coach at Wisconsin where he coached until 2010 when he once again returned to the NFL. In 2011 and 2012 John was the running backs coach in Carolina for the Panthers. In 2013 he returned to Cleveland and was the Browns running backs coach. In 2014 he returned to coaching collegiately at Pitt where he coached James Conner to 2014 ACC Player of the Year honors. He then returned to Wisconsin under head coach Paul Chryst and coached the running backs there from 2015 to 2020. Some of the players he coached included: Corey Clement, Dare Ogunbowale, Jonathan Taylor. In 2021 John went to the SEC to coach at Kentucky as the team’s running backs coach and co special teams coordinator.

Personal life
He and his wife, Karen, have three children; Jonathan, Leighton and Devynn.

References 

1965 births
Living people
American football running backs
Appalachian State Mountaineers football coaches
Appalachian State Mountaineers football players
Atlanta Falcons players
Baltimore Ravens coaches
Carolina Panthers coaches
Cleveland Browns coaches
Fresno State Bulldogs football coaches
Kentucky Wildcats football coaches
National Conference Pro Bowl players
People from Reidsville, North Carolina
Pittsburgh Panthers football coaches
Players of American football from North Carolina
Settle family
Washington Redskins players
Wisconsin Badgers football coaches